Erhan Şentürk (born 4 May 1989) is a Turkish professional footballer who plays for Bucaspor 1928. Erhan is a product of Galatasaray's youth system.

Career
He made his debut for Galatasaray against Steaua București in Aug 2008 (UEFA Champions League 2008–09 Third qualifying round, first match, in Ali Sami Yen), coming on as a substitute.

He has been playing for Diyarbakirspor since 2008 and has played 29 games in the second division and 4 games in Turkcell Super League.

Honours
 Galatasaray
 Turkish Super Cup: 1 (2008)

External links

1989 births
Footballers from Istanbul
Living people
Turkish footballers
Turkey youth international footballers
Turkey under-21 international footballers
Association football midfielders
Galatasaray A2 footballers
Galatasaray S.K. footballers
Diyarbakırspor footballers
Kartalspor footballers
Karşıyaka S.K. footballers
Çaykur Rizespor footballers
Gaziantep F.K. footballers
MKE Ankaragücü footballers
Bandırmaspor footballers
Samsunspor footballers
Süper Lig players
TFF First League players
TFF Second League players